Ricardo Daniel ("Turco") Julio (born January 13, 1976) is an Argentine professional racing cyclist.

Career highlights

2008
3rd in Stage 7 Vuelta a San Juan (ARG)
2008
3rd in General Classification Vuelta a San Juan (ARG)

External links

Overview

1976 births
Living people
Argentine male cyclists
Place of birth missing (living people)
21st-century Argentine people